The 2008–09 Iowa State Cyclones women's basketball team represented Iowa State University in the 2008–09 NCAA Division I women's basketball season. A member of the Big 12 Conference in the North Division, Iowa State played home games at the Hilton Coliseum in Ames, Iowa. Under 14th year head coach Bill Fennelly, Iowa State finished the season 27–9, including an 11–5 record in Big 12 play for a third place tie in conference standings, with a no. 11 ranking in the final Coaches Poll. In the 2009 NCAA Division I women's basketball tournament, Iowa State advanced to the Elite Eight round for the second time in program history.

Previous season
Iowa State finished the 2007–08 season 21–13 , including 7–9 in Big 12 games for a seventh place tie in the Big 12 standings. In the 2008 Big 12 Tournament, Iowa State advanced to the semifinal round. Iowa State received an at-large bid to the 2008 NCAA tournament, in which they made the second round.

Roster

Schedule and results
Sources:

|-
!colspan=6 style=| Exhibition

|-
!colspan=6 style=| Regular Season

|-
!colspan=6 style=| Big 12 Tournament

|-
!colspan=6 style=| NCAA tournament

Rankings

Awards and honors
 Heather Ezell
 All-Big 12 Second Team
 Alison Lacey
 All-Big 12 Honorable Mention

References

Iowa State
Iowa State Cyclones women's basketball seasons
Iowa State
Iowa State Cyc
Iowa State Cyc